Bongo is a Bangladeshi startup company, which is the first and biggest streaming video-on-demand service in Bangladesh. Founded in 2013, it began streaming classic content over its YouTube channel in January 2014.

History
Bongo BD was founded by Ahad Mohammad Bhai and Navidul Huq in 2013. It partnered with Grameenphone to launch an over-the-top media service called Bioscope in 2016. By February 2017, Bongo BD offered more than 25,000 titles for streaming, from classic films to contemporary blockbusters, documentaries, original shows, and live sports. Their daily visitor count across all platforms was 1.5 million. The Bioscope live-TV and video-on-demand app was launched in August. Within a few months it was the number one app in Bangladesh on the Google Play Store and had 3 million unique users. In October it won the BASIS National ICT Award in the Media and Entertainment Technology category.

Initially, Bongo BD operated on a subscription revenue model with additional income from advertisements. In response to the COVID-19 pandemic, Bongo BD made all of its content free for users in Bangladesh starting in March 2020. In May, they said they exceeded 100 million subscribers and 1 billion monthly views. They reintroduced their subscription fees in July, which caused their subscriber numbers to drop. In September 2021, they reported having more than 83 million subscribers and 210 million unique monthly viewers. Their content library had grown to 57,000 titles.

Contents

Bongo original series

Dubbed films

Sports

References

External links
 Official Website
 

Entertainment companies of Bangladesh
Internet television streaming services in Bangladesh
Companies based in Dhaka
Bangladeshi entertainment websites
2013 establishments in Bangladesh
Entertainment companies established in 2013
Record label distributors